A corm is an underground part of a plant stem.

Corm may also refer to:
 Carbon monoxide-releasing molecules (CORMs) 
 Corm (surname), list of people with the surname